Cedar Pond is the name of some bodies of water in the United States:

Cedar Pond (Massachusetts), in Lakeville, Massachusetts
Cedar Pond (New Hampshire), in Milan, New Hampshire
Cedar Pond (New Jersey), In West Milford, New Jersey

See also
Cedar Lake (disambiguation)